Applause, Applause is a Canadian musical variety television miniseries which aired on CBC Television in 1974.

Premise
This was a Winnipeg-produced musical variety series featuring Dean Regan and Dinah Christie.

Scheduling
The half-hour episodes aired on Thursdays at 9:30 p.m. (Eastern) from 23 May to 6 June 1974.

References

External links
 
 

CBC Television original programming
1974 Canadian television series debuts
1974 Canadian television series endings
Television shows filmed in Winnipeg